Cembalea affinis is a species of jumping spider species in the genus Cembalea. Only the male has been described, which was first identified in 2002. It is very similar to the closely related species Cembalea pulmosa, but can be distinguished by its longer embolus.

Taxonomy
Cembalea affinis was first described by Christine Rollard and Wanda Wesołowska in 2002. It was allocated to the genus Cembalea, which had been created by Wesołowska in 1993. The species name is the Latin word for related and recalls the similarity between this spider and its relative Cembalea pulmosa.

Description
Only the male has been described. The spider is small and brown, with brown hairs covering much of the body. The abdomen is elongated and measures  in length. It is a lighter shade of brown and has an even lighter stripe. It can be distinguished from Cembalea plumosa by its longer embolus.

Distribution
Cembalea affinis has only been found in Guinea.

References

Fauna of Guinea
Salticidae
Spiders described in 2002
Spiders of Africa
Taxa named by Wanda Wesołowska